Luciano Silva da Silva (born 13 June 1987), simply known as Luciano is a Brazilian professional footballer who played as a centre back.

Club career
After playing for a number of clubs in the lower leagues of Brazilian football, Silva signed for Rangers in the Hong Kong First Division in 2013 from Vietnamese club An Giang.
He made his debut for the club in a 1–2 away win against Kitchee. He scored his first goal against Yokohama FC Hong Kong.

On 3 July 2017, it was revealed that Lee Man had added Luciano ahead of the 2017-18 season.

On 9 August 2019, after being a free agent for a year, Luciano signed for another Hong Kong Premier League club Happy Valley. On 2 June 2020, 
the club announced that his contract had been renewed for the following season.

On 1 July 2021, Luciano joined Southern. On 17 July 2022, he left the club.

References

External links

Luciano Silva da Silva at HKFA

1987 births
Living people
Association football defenders
Brazilian footballers
Footballers from São Paulo
Sport Club Internacional players
Clube Atlético Bragantino players
Grêmio Esportivo Brasil players
América Futebol Clube (SP) players
Hong Kong Rangers FC players
Yuen Long FC players
Hong Kong Premier League players
Lee Man FC players
Happy Valley AA players
Southern District FC players
Expatriate footballers in Hong Kong
Hong Kong League XI representative players